ESL Pro League Season 3 (shortened as EPL Season 3) was an Electronic Sports League Counter-Strike: Global Offensive tournament. It was the third season of the ESL Pro League. The Finals took place in London, United Kingdom from May 11 to May 15, 2016. Europe's regular season began on February 9, with Astralis beating Natus Vincere and ended with Ninjas in Pyjamas defeating G2 Esports. North America's season started with Renegades defeating Enemy (which later signed with Selfless Gaming) and ended with Team Liquid defeating Splyce The finals concluded with Luminosity Gaming defeating G2 Esports in a close best of five grand finals, which many consider to be a classic. Teams from two continents, North America and Europe competed in twelve team leagues and play against each other twice to determine the top four teams from each continent that would play in the Finals. The finals will offer a prize pool of US$510,000.

Format
Each continent featured the top nine teams from last season's ESL Pro League Season 2, two teams from the ESL Pro League Season 2 Relegation, and one team from the Wild Card. Teams within each continent will play each other twice to determine the top four qualifier to the Finals in London. There will be a total of nine weeks in this phase of the tournament. All games in the preliminaries will be played online.

The top four teams after the conclusion of the regular season moved on to London to play in the Finals; in addition, those teams were invited to next season's ESL Pro League. Teams that placed fifth to eleventh place did not make the Finals, but were invited to next season's ESL Pro League. The teams in 12th place were required to play in Season 3's Relegation match, in which two teams from each continent play to see which team moves on to next season's ESL Pro League

The Finals consisted of eight teams, four from Europe and four from North America. These teams were separated into two groups – the first and third seeds from North America and the second and fourth seeds from Europe will be in one group and the other teams in the other group. The group stage consisted of the highest seed going against the lowest seed and the middle two seeds against each other, both games in a best of one format. The winners will play in a best of one to determine one team in the Playoffs; the losers will play in a best of three to determine which team gets eliminated from the tournament. The remaining two teams will play in a best of three to determine which team will be the second team in the group to move on to the Playoffs. In the Playoffs, the semifinals will be a best of three and the finals will be a best of five. The winner of the finals will win the tournament and the top prize. All games in the Finals were played offline.

Teams

North America

Broadcast Talent
Commentators
 Cory "megaman" Gilbert
 John "BLU" Mullen
 Jason "moses" O'Toole

Final standings

Scores

1Luminosity Gaming and Counter Logic Gaming forfeited their matches against OpTic Gaming and NRG eSports, respectively, since both teams were attending DreamHack Masters Malmö 2016 in Sweden.

Europe

Broadcast Talent
Commentators
 Anders Blume
 Joona "natu" Leppänen
 Mitch "Uber" Leslie
 Auguste "Semmler" Massonnat
 Jason "moses" O'Toole
 Lauren "Pansy" Scott
 Niels Christian "NaToSaphiX" Sillassen
 Matthew "Sadokist" Trivett
Analysts
 Chad "SPUNJ" Burchill
 Halvor "vENdetta" Gulestøl
 Janko "YNk" Paunović
 Leigh "Deman" Smith
Observer
 Alex "Rushly" Rush

Final standings

Scores

Finals
The finalized teams are shown below. Each team's world ranking for May 11, 2016 is also shown.

Broadcast Talent
Host
 Oliver James "OJ Borg" Borg D'Anastasi
Desk Host
 Alex "Machine" Richardson
Commentators
 Anders Blume
 Henry "HenryG" Greer
 Auguste "Semmler" Massonnat
 John "BLU" Mullen
 Jason "moses" O'Toole
 Lauren "Pansy" Scott
 Matthew" Sadokist" Trivett
Analyst
 Janko "YNk" Paunović
Observers
 Heather "sapphiRe" Garrozo
 Alex "Rushly" Rush

Group stage

Group A

Group B

Playoffs

Bracket

Semifinals

Finals

Finals Standings

References

2016 in esports
ESL Pro League